Sericomyrmex diego is a species of ant in the family Formicidae.

References

Further reading

 

Myrmicinae